Union Park is a census-designated place (CDP) in Orange County, Florida, United States. The population was 10,452 at the 2020 census. It is part of the Orlando–Kissimmee Metropolitan Statistical Area. The ZIP codes for Union Park are 32817 and 32825. The community is southwest of the University of Central Florida.

Geography
Union Park is located at  (28.565461, -81.237144).

According to the United States Census Bureau, the CDP has a total area of 7.8 km (3.0 mi2), of which 7.7 km (3.0 mi2) is land and 0.1 km (0.04 mi2) (0.99%) is water.

The boundaries of Union Park are North Dean Road to the west, the Econlockhatchee River to the west and north, J Blanchard Trail to the north, Rouse Road to the east, and Bloomfield Drive to the south.

Schooling 
Union Park has four schools: one elementary, one middle, one charter and one high school.

Public Schools 

 Union Park Elementary School
 Lawton Chiles Elementary School
 Union Park Middle School
 University High School

Independent Schools 

 Renaissance Charter School

Demographics
As of the census of 2000, there were 10,191 people, 3,644 households, and 2,507 families residing in the CDP. The population density was 1,316.0/km (3,411.5/mi2). There were 3,791 housing units at an average density of 489.5/km (1,269.1/mi2). The racial makeup of the CDP was 78.16% White, 4.94% African American, 0.32% Native American, 3.45% Asian, 0.06% Pacific Islander, 9.43% from other races, and 3.64% from two or more races. Hispanic or Latino of any race were 26.07% of the population. The ancestral population are German (12.3%), Irish (10.5%), English (8.1%), United States (6.8%), Italian (6.6%) and Polish (3.2%). 10.2% of the community's population is foreign born (6.4% Latin America, 1.8% Asia).

There were 3,644 households, out of which 33.3% had children under the age of 18 living with them, 50.6% were married couples living together, 13.2% had a female householder with no husband present, and 31.2% were non-families. 17.3% of all households were made up of individuals, and 3.6% had someone living alone who was 65 years of age or older. The average household size was 2.79 and the average family size was 3.19.

In the CDP, the population was spread out, with 24.9% under the age of 18, 14.8% from 18 to 24, 32.6% from 25 to 44, 19.0% from 45 to 64, and 8.7% who were 65 years of age or older. The median age was 31 years. For every 100 females, there were 100.5 males. For every 100 females age 18 and over, there were 97.9 males.

The median income for a household in the CDP was $44,174, and the median income for a family was $45,191. Males had a median income of $31,982 versus $23,384 for females. The per capita income for the CDP was $19,087. About 7.9% of families and 11.3% of the population were below the poverty line, including 13.9% of those under age 18 and 9.5% of those age 65 or over.

Population history

Neighboring communities 
The nearest communities are Azalea Park (4 miles southwest), Goldenrod (5 miles northwest), Oviedo (8 miles north), Winter Park (8.5 miles northwest), Conway (8 miles southwest), and Bithlo (8 miles east). Downtown Orlando is 9 miles to the west.

References

Census-designated places in Orange County, Florida
Greater Orlando
Census-designated places in Florida